The Penkovka culture ( Penkivska kultura) is an archaeological culture in Ukraine spanning Moldova and reaching into Romania. Its western boundary is usually taken to at the middle Prut and Dniester rivers, where contact with the Korchak culture occurs. Its bearers are commonly identified as the Antes people of 6th-century Byzantine historiography.

Geography 
The core of the culture seems to be in Left-bank Ukraine, especially along the Sula, Seim, Psel, Donets and Oril rivers, but its territory extends to Right-bank Ukraine, and Penkovka pottery is also found in eastern and southern Romania, where it co-exists with wheel-made pottery of late Roman derivation; and is referred to as the Ipotesti–Candesti culture by Romanian archaeologists. Penkovka-type pottery has even been found in Byzantine forts in the north-eastern Balkans. "Nomadic" style wheel-made pottery (called Pastyrske or Saltovo ware) also occurs in the Ukrainian Penkovka sites as well as in the lower Danube and Bulgaria, but is most commonly found within the Saltovo-Mayaki culture, associated with Bulgars, Khazars and Alans. One of the ancestors of the bearers of the Penkovka ​​culture were population of Sântana de Mureș—Cherniakhiv culture, which should be described by the culture of the Goths. Since at least the 13th century, the Baltic peoples have called Russians Gudos (Gudos, Gudai), that is, goths.

Hand-made Penkovka pottery is distinguished from Prague-Korchak types on the basis of its biconical profile and tendency for out-turned rims. However, Florin Curta has argued that there can be no simple relationship between the type of ceramic vessel and the ethnicity of groups which consumed them. E. Teodor performed a detailed analysis of ceramic vessels in 6th century southeastern Europe, and discovered a complex picture which cannot be reduced to 2 or 3 broad 'archaeological cultures', as each microregion and even individual site shows idiosyncrasies in their ceramic profile and degree of connectivity to other regions of 'Slavic Europe'.

Penkovka settlements 
Penkovka settlements tended to be located on the terraces of rivers, usually arranged in a linear fashion. Buildings were usually square, post-hole constructs dug into the ground, equipped with an oven in the corners. There were also rounded buildings, otherwise not found in other Slavic territories, which have been associated with a nomadic influence. However, they are different from traditional tent-like nomadic yurts. Settlements tended to be abandoned after a period of habitation and were often re-occupied years later, reflective of the itinerant form of agriculture practiced by the populace. The latter has been excavated in detail, and appears to have been an Iron Age fortification which was also occupied in early medieval times. Measuring 25 ha, it included numerous settlement buildings as well as evidence of specialised industrial activity. Szmoniewski argues that "Pastyrs’ke may have also been a political power center, the seat of a ruler with territorial authority".

Two forms of burials are found north of the Black Sea in the 6th and 7th centuries. Poorly furnished cremation burials, either inside urns or into shallow pits, are concentrated in the forest-steppe zone; whilst more elaborately equipped inhumations are found in the open steppe. Traditionally, the latter are attributed to "Turkic" nomads whilst the cremation burials were a typically Slavic rite. However, a straightforward ethnic attribution has been questioned - as the pottery and metalwork (see below) found in the 'nomadic' inhumations shows clear analogies to that found in 'Slavic' settlements in the forest-zone. Thus Curta has argued that the inhumation burials represented a marker of social distinction of chiefs and 'big men' from the forest-zone settlements.

Antian antiquities 
Another set of cultural elements often attributed to the Antes are numerous hoards of silver and gold ornaments dated to the 7th century, and are variously called "Antian antiquites" or the Martynovka culture. Scholars have debated to whom the Martynovka elements belonged to since the late 19th century; as A. Spitsyn attributed them to the Slavic Antes, whilst J. Harmatta rather attributed them to Turkic groups, specifically the Kutrigurs. The situation was clarified when Curta's analysis revealed that early in the 7th century, such metalwork appears in hoards deposited in the forest-steppe, whilst later assemblages appear as interment gifts in 'nomadic burials'. Thus, again, rather than simplistic ethnic explanations, Curta's analysis suggests that the pattern of ornament consumption varied with time and was related to social status and gender: i.e. earlier in the 6th century, elites displayed status by burying hoards of silver in the forest-steppe, whilst later there was more aggressive posturing and status display in the form of richly furnished male warrior graves, no doubt related to the competition for supremacy on the north Black Sea region between Pannonian Avars, Bulgars, Khazars and Western Gokturks. The metalwork betrays a variety of influences - especially the world of the steppe nomad which in turn showed Caucasian, Byzantine, and Sassanian inspiration. Yet other elements showed affinities with the 'Balto-Slavic' world of the forests of Eastern Europe.

Overall, the equation of the Penkovka culture and Martynovka hoards with the Antes is problematic, as such cultural features exist into the 8th century, long after the Antes were defeated by the Avars in 602 AD and ceased to exist as an independent tribal polity. Such diffuse styles cannot be directly linked to any single people, but rather reflect a myriad of peoples who existed in the Black Sea region from 450–750 AD, including Antes, Kutrigurs and Bulgars.

Early Volyntsevo culture, as well as the Saltovo-Mayaki culture developed on the basis of Kolochin and Penkovka cultures.

References

Literature 
 
 
 
 
 
 
 
 
 
 
 
 

Archaeological cultures of Eastern Europe
Archaeological cultures of Southeastern Europe
Slavic archaeological cultures
Early medieval archaeological cultures of Europe
Archaeological cultures in Bulgaria
Archaeological cultures in Moldova
Archaeological cultures in Romania
Archaeological cultures in Ukraine